The Irish national cricket team toured South Africa in September 2016. They played two One day internationals, one each against South Africa and Australia. They lost heavily in both matches, by 206 runs against South Africa and by nine wickets against Australia. Their match against South Africa was the first ODI to use the updated rules to the DRS system, which brought more of the stumps into play for LBW decisions.

Squads

AB de Villiers was originally named as the captain for the game against Ireland. However, he was still recovering from an injury, so Faf du Plessis took his place as captain and Rilee Rossouw was also added to the squad. Chris Morris suffered a knee injury ruling him out for two months. He was replaced by Dwaine Pretorius.

South Africa vs Ireland

Australia vs Ireland

See also
 Australian cricket team in South Africa in 2016–17

References

2016 in Irish cricket
2016 in South African cricket
Irish cricket tours abroad
International cricket competitions in 2016–17